A wayfarer is a person who travels on foot. It may also refer to:

Literature
 The Wayfarer (novel), a 1912 novel by Natsume Sōseki
 Wayfarer, a book in the Faery Rebels series by Canadian author R. J. Anderson
 Wayfarers, a series of sci-fi novels (2015-2021) by Becky Chambers

Music
 Wayfarer (album), a 1983 album by Jan Garbarek
 The Wayfarer, a 2011 album by Richard Warren
 "Wayfarer", a 1996 song by In Flames from The Jester Race
 "Wayfarer", a 2002 song by Hot Water Music from Caution
 "The Wayfarer", a 2002 track by Finnish symphonic metal band Nightwish from "Ever Dream"
 "The Wayfarer", a 2002 song by Nightwish from Century Child
 "Wayfarer", a 2003 song by Kayo Dot from Choirs of the Eye
 "The Wayfarer", a 2010 trilogy of songs by Winterfylleth from The Mercian Sphere
 "Wayfarer", a 2012 song by Audien
 "Wayfarer", a 2014 song by Nell Bryden
 "The Wayfarer", a 2019 song by Bruce Springsteen from Western Stars

Transportation
 Wayfarer (dinghy), a class of sailboat
 Bristol Wayfarer, a twin-engine passenger aircraft
 Chrysler Wayfarer, built from 1958 to 1961
 Dodge Wayfarer, built from 1949 to 1952
 A bus built by Thomas Harrington & Sons from 1951 to 1961

Other
 Wayfarer (typeface)
 The Wayfarer, a  painting by Hieronymus Bosch
 Ray-Ban Wayfarer, a model of sunglasses
 Wayfarers (role-playing game)
 A web browser for MorphOS
 A ship in the Doctor Who episode "Prisoner of the Daleks"
 Batasari (Wayfarer), a 1961 Indian Telugu-language film
 Rahi (film) (Wayfarer), a 1953 Hindi film
 Viburnum lantana a genus of about 150–175 species of flowering plants

See also